{{Infobox legislature
 | name               = Ninth Punjab Legislative Assembly 
 | native_name        = 
 | native_name_lang   = 
 | transcription_name = 
 | legislature        = Punjab Legislative Assembly
 | coa_pic            = 
 | coa_res            = 250px
 | coa_alt            = 
 | house_type         = Unicameral
 | term_length        = 1985-1987
 | body               = 
 | houses             = 
 | foundation = 14 October 1985
 | disbanded = 11 May 1987
 | suspension = 
 | preceded_by = Eighth Punjab Legislative Assembly 
 | succeeded_by = 10th Punjab Assembly
 | leader1_type       = Speaker 
 | leader1            = Ravi Inder Singh(1985-1986)
 | party1    = 
 | leader2   = Surjit Singh Minhas(1986-1987)
 | leader3_type       = Deputy Speaker
 | leader3           = Nirmal Singh Kahlon(1985-1986)
 | leader4            = Jaswant Singh(1986-1987)
 | leader5_type       = Leader of House(Chief Minister)
| leader5             =Surjit Singh Barnala
| leader6             =
 | leader7_type       = Leader of the Opposition
 | leader7            = Gurbinder Kaur Brar
 | leader8            = 
 | committees1        = 
 | committees2        = 
 | joint_committees   = 
 | voting_system1     = first-past-the-post
 | voting_system2     = 
 | last_election1     = 1985
 | next_election1     = 1992
 | redistricting = 
 | session_room       = 
 | session_res        = 
 | session_alt        = 
 | meeting_place      = 
 | members            = 117
 | structure1    = 
 | structure1_res = 
 | political_groups1  = Government (73)
  SAD (73)Opposition (44)  INC (32)
  BJP (6)
  CPI (1)
  JP (1)
  IND (4)
}} 
The 1985 Punjab Legislative Assembly election''' was the ninth Vidhan Sabha (Legislative Assembly) election of the state. Shiromani Akali Dal emerged as the victorious with 73 seats in the 117-seat legislature in the election. The Indian National Congress became the official opposition, holding 34 seats. On 11 May 1987, Assembly was dissolved and president rule was imposed.

Background

Insurgency

Dissolution of Assembly

Notes

References

9th
1985 establishments in Punjab, India